The Billboard Latin Music Award for Hot Latin Song of the Year (formerly Hot Latin Track of the Year) is an honor presented annually at the Billboard Latin Music Awards, a ceremony which honors "the most popular albums, songs, and performers in Latin music, as determined by the actual sales, radio airplay, online streaming and social data that informs Billboards weekly charts." The award is given to the best performing singles on Billboards Hot Latin Songs chart, which measures the most popular Latin recordings in the United States. The Hot Latin Songs chart was established by the magazine in September 1986 and was originally based on airplay on Latin music radio stations. Since October 2012, chart rankings are based on digital sales, radio airplay, and online streaming. From 1995 to 1998, each music genre's field (pop, tropical/salsa and Regional Mexican) had their own Hot Latin Track of the Year category.

Enrique Iglesias and Nicky Jam are the most awarded acts in the category with three wins each. Alejandro Fernández, Wisin & Yandel, Don Omar, Romeo Santos, Ozuna, and Nicky Jam are the only acts with two nominated songs in the same year, a milestone achieved twice by Santos. As of 2017, only Iglesias and Nicky Jam have won Hot Latin Song of the Year twice in a row. As of 2021, the holders are Bad Bunny and Jhay Cortez for the song "Dakiti".

Recipients

Records

Most nominations

Most awards

See also
Billboard Music Award for Top Latin Song
Latin Grammy Award for Record of the Year
Latin Grammy Award for Song of the Year

References

Awards established in 1994
Billboard Latin Music Awards
Song awards
1994 establishments in the United States